Juan José Rendón Delgado (born 27 January 1964), known professionally as J. J. Rendón, is a Venezuelan political consultant, psychologist, and political activist.

Rendón has been credited for the successful presidential campaigns of Juan Manuel Santos (first elected in 2010 and reelected in 2014), Porfirio Lobo Sosa (2010), and Enrique Peña Nieto (2012). In 2012, he was named one of the most prominent Latin American consultants by the U.S.-based publication Campaigns & Elections. Rendon was inducted into the Hall of Fame of Political Consulting by Reed Latino. In 2016, ABC Internacional, a newspaper of record based in Madrid, named him one of "The 10 Most Important Political Consultants in the World" along with James Carville, Karl Rove, and Mary Matalin.

Rendón was appointed in 2019 by contested Venezuelan acting president Juan Guaidó to lead the Strategy Committee to search new options to overthrow Nicolás Maduro, until his resignation on 11 May 2020.

Rendón is the founder of the consulting firm J.J Rendón y Asociados Creatividad y Estrategia, Inc., and Get Real Films, the latter of which produced the documentary Here comes the Wolf. He is also a partner of V-me, the first Spanish broadcast television network in association with public television stations.

Early life and education 
Rendón was born in 1964 in Caracas, Venezuela in a Military hospital in the parish of San Juan. His parents were local organisers for the Acción Democrática (Democratic Action) political party.

Before starting his career in an advertising agency in his early 20s, Rendón studied psychology at Andrés Bello Catholic University and Central University of Venezuela. He obtained a postgraduate degree in Ontopsychology from the Associazione Internazionale, an Italian institution founded by Antonio Meneghetti. He also obtained degrees in Psychology of Mass Communication, Strategic Planning, and Publicity and Marketing Management.

Career

Entry into politics
At the age of 24, Rendón volunteered for Carlos Andrés Pérez's second presidential run. He initially worked as a driver before assisting American political consultant Joseph Napolitan to get the vote out.

Rendón founded an advertising company, Chiripa Publicidad, in Caracas, Venezuela. One of his first clients was the former Venezuelan president Rafael Caldera (1916-2009), who was re-elected for a second term in 1993.

Politics

1989-1993 
Rendón later served as Napolitan's assistant in a political campaign for the second presidential run of Carlos Andres Perez.

2000

Consulting for political parties 
In the early 2000s, Rendón worked with various political organisations, such as the Mexican Institutional Revolutionary Party (PRI) and Social Party of National Unity.

2004 Hipólito Mejía presidential campaign 
Rendón was the political advisor for Hipólito Mejía, the candidate of the Dominican Revolutionary party, during his successful presidential campaign in 2004.

2006–2013

Senior Advisor Party of National Unity 
When Juan Manuel Santos was named Minister of Defense during the presidency of Álvaro Uribe Vélez in Colombia in 2006, Rendón became the lead strategist of the Social Party of National Unity (Party of the U), and was tasked with training the party in political communication.

2008 
JJ Rendón was accused on various social media platforms of being behind the "historical fantasy" of the rescue by the Colombian government (former president Álvaro Uribe Vélez) of Emmanuel (a child that was captured and held hostage) and that the child was living in Bogotá, which ended up being true. Soon after, it was proven via DNA testing that the child was Emmanuel. Venezuelan Foreign Minister Nicolás Maduro questioned the results of the DNA testing, stating that Colombia did not allow Venezuelan specialists to conduct their own tests and had created a "cloak of doubt". However, in January 2008, FARC rebels released a communiqué in which they admitted that Emmanuel "is the same three-year-old who was living in foster care in Bogotá, Colombia, who was due to be part of hostage deal."

2010

Juan Manuel Santos presidential campaign 
Rendón, the lead strategist of the presidential campaign of Juan Manuel Santos in Colombia, helped turn a close presidential race in Colombia into a landslide victory for Juan Manuel Santos against the Green Party candidate Antanas Mockus.

Porfirio Lobo Sosa presidential campaign 
Honduran politician and agricultural landowner Porfirio Lobo Sosa, known as Pepe Lobo, was elected president of Honduras in 2010, with Rendón as his political advisor. Rendón was also consultant to Honduran politician Juan Orlando Hernández during his successful presidential campaign in 2012.

2012 Enrique Peña Nieto presidential campaign 
In 2012, Enrique Peña Nieto was elected 57th President of Mexico. Rendón was his political advisor.

2013

Juan Manuel Santos re-election campaign 
Rendón joined Juan Manuel Santos for his re-election campaign in Colombia. In May 2014, Javier Antonio Calle Sernaby, leader of the Colombian drug cartel Los Rastrojos, alleged that he paid Rendón $12 million to help him negotiate favourable terms of surrender and avoid extradition to the US. Rendón denied receiving the money, but stepped down as campaign chief in the election's final stretch. Santos beat his opponent by six percent in a run-off election in June 2014, securing his second four-year term as Colombia's president.

Henrique Capriles Radonski presidential campaign 
Rendón was the main strategist for the Venezuelan presidential candidate Henrique Capriles. Official results gave Nicolas Maduro—who had assumed the role of acting president since Chávez's death—a narrow victory over Capriles. Capriles claimed that electoral fraud had taken place on April 14, 2013, in the special election where Maduro was elected president. Capriles provided evidence of the alleged fraud and refused "to accept the vote-tally unless the electoral authority agrees to open all the ballot boxes and count the paper ballots".

Relationship with the media 
Rendón had over a million of followers on Twitter in 2013, and is one of the most followed political strategists on social media.

Rendon became well known in 2013 through media outlets such as CNN and interviews with journalists including Jorge Ramos, Maria Elvira Salazar, Fernando del Rincón, and Jaime Bayly. He made an appearance on CNN to talk about the special elections being held in Venezuela to replace Hugo Chávez after his death in March 2013. In an interview with Jaime Bayly in January 2016, Rendón claimed that he had been a victim of political persecution and the victim of more than 140 attacks by the Venezuelan government.

Political activist 
Rendón gained international attention for his activism against what he regards as neo-totalitarian regimes. He is a self-declared enemy of socialism of the 21st century and supports presidential and governor candidates running in opposition to its policies.

His position with regards to these governments, especially the Venezuelan government, has drawn strong reactions from socialism of the 21st century, Hugo Chávez, and supporters of communism and socialism in general. On many occasions, Rendón has faced strong opposition from Venezuelan senior officials, including president Nicolás Maduro, who declared in July 2012 that Rendón was "the number one public enemy of the Venezuelan state".

The lead strategist of the Venezuelan government, Jorge Rodríguez, has repeatedly insinuated that J.J. Rendón is the main strategist of the Venezuelan opposition, calling him a "psychopath" on government-funded media outlets, including the public channel VTV (Venezuelan Television Corporation) and TeleSUR, a Caracas-based television network funded by the governments of Venezuela, Cuba, and Nicaragua.

Since 2004, Rendón has claimed that the Venezuelan government has committed fraud in the presidential elections. 
On December 6, 2015, having won 19 elections in 15 years, the Venezuelan government recognised that the Venezuelan opposition had won 112 seats in the National Assembly. However, president Nicolás Maduro and lead strategist of the Venezuelan government Jorge Rodríguez, claimed on national television that the Democratic Unity coalition (Venezuelan opposition party, MUD) had won it because of the "economic and psychological war" allegedly led by Rendón and other opponents. On his daily show, Jaime Bayly congratulated Venezuelan opposition figures Henrique Capriles Radonski and Rendón for the victory.

In 2013, then-Venezuelan president Nicolás Maduro declared that Rendón was a "stateless" person after accusing him of being linked to an audio recording "widely circulated on social media purporting to be the late Venezuelan leader saying that he's still alive". The Venezuelan government denied him the fundamental human right to a nationality, Despite being born in Venezuela, Rendón cannot obtain a Venezuelan passport as of 2016. He has claimed to be subjected to several other human rights violations and political persecution.

In May 2016, Rendón received political asylum from the United States government.

The Power of One 

Rendón started The Power of One seminar series in 2013. It features practical strategies for political activists who wish to oppose neo-totalitarian regimes known as "The New Face of Dictatorship" by Rendón.

On 16 September 2016, Rendón was invited to present "The Power of One" at Harvard University of Boston. Because of the seminar, Rendón received a Doctor Honoris Causa from Cambridge University.

Allegations
Rendón was faced with strong opposition from various Chávez-funded media outlets, centered on his work ethic and strategy tactics.

Allegations were brought forward in November 2013 by Venezuelan prosecutor Luisa Ortega Díaz who requested Interpol detain Rendón under charges of assault. Rendón denied these claims and asserted that Venezuela could not legally ask for his arrest without a warrant being present. Despite the allegations, no such warrant was placed on Interpol's wanted persons list, and the claims were dismissed.

In 2014, President Mauricio Funes of El Salvador accused Rendón of conducting dirty war campaigns throughout Latin America. Rendón sued Funes for defamation in Florida, but the court ruled that Funes could not be sued for his official acts.

In March 2016, Andrés Sepúlveda, who was serving 10 years in prison for charges such as use of malicious software, conspiracy to commit crime, violation of personal data, and espionage, claimed that most of his work in the past eight years had been on the payroll of Rendón. Sepúlveda provided Bloomberg Businessweek with what he said were e-mails showing conversations between him, Rendón, and Rendón's consulting firm concerning hacking and the progress of campaign-related cyber attacks. Rendón denied using Sepúlveda for anything illegal, and disputed Sepúlveda's account of their relationship. Rendón filed a lawsuit against Bloomberg Businessweek, both in the United States and in Colombia, because of the story they ran.

Macuto Bay raid

In August 2019, Juan Guaidó tasked Rendón with a "Strategic Committee" to investigate scenarios for achieving the removal of Maduro from office. Members of the Strategic Committee argued that the Venezuelan Constitution, the United Nations Convention against Transnational Organized Crime, and other treaties justified action against Maduro.

Rendón stated that the Strategic Committee had contacted numerous groups about forcibly removing Maduro from office, but they demanded US$500 million. He then made contact with Jordan Goudreau, founder and owner of Silvercorp USA, on 7 September 2019 at a condominium in Miami, where Silvercorp presented a sales pitch to Rendón that offered the capture or extraction of Maduro from Venezuela, all for US$212.9 million. Rendón signed a retainer agreement in Washington, D.C. on behalf of the Guaidó government with Silvercorp on 16 October 2019. An amount of US$1.5 million was later insisted by Silvercorp in order to initiate "Operation Resolution", the plan to remove Maduro, install Guaidó as President of Venezuela. However, Guaidó representatives ultimately turned down Goudreau's proposal. Goudreau was later responsible for the foiled Macuto Bay raid.

Following the raid, Guaido's team initially said they had “no relationship with any company in the security and defense branch”, however Rendón later admitted that an “exploratory agreement” with Silvercorp was signed to seek the capture of members of Maduro's government.

On 8 May 2020, Venezuelan Attorney General Tarek William Saab requested the extradition of Rendón from the United States, along with Silvercorp USA founder Jordan Goudreau and exiled Venezuelan lawmaker Sergio Vergara, for the "design, financing, and execution" of the plan to overthrow Maduro.

Achievements 
J.J. Rendón was given the flag of the United States of America, after it was raised in his honor by the United States Congress, in recognition of his twenty-five years of work as a political consultant.  

|-
| 2015
| Democracy and Human Rights
| The Humanitarian Innovation Forum
| 
|}
In 2015, Rendón received the Humanitarian Award for Innovation from the Humanitarian Innovation Forum (HIF) at the United Nations headquarters in New York.[14]
|-
| 2015
| Crisis management of the Year
| Victory Awards
| 
|}

|-
| 2015
| Truth and Freedom Medal
| VI Cumbre Mundial de Comunicación Política
|  
|}

In 2014, Rendón was nominated as Political Consultant of the Year by Victory Awards.
|-
| 2012
| Hall of Fame of Political Consulting
| Victory Awards
| 
|}
Rendón was ranked as one of the top five most prominent Latin American consultants by Campaigns & Elections in 2012.

|-
| 2011
| Doctor Honoris Causa in political science
| International University of Panamá 
| 
|}
In 2011, he received the Order of Merit award from Honduran President Porfirio Lobo Sosa.[13]
|-
| 2011
| Doctor Honoris Causa for educational excellence
| Ricardo Palma de Lima University
| 
|}

|-
| 2003
| Special Annual Prize for New Techniques in Political Communication
| ALACOP
| 
|}

References

External links 
Power of one: JJ Rendon at TEDxUNPlaza 2013

1964 births
Living people
Political consultants
People from Caracas
Andrés Bello Catholic University alumni
Central University of Venezuela alumni
People of the Crisis in Venezuela
Fugitives wanted by Venezuela